The 4th constituency of Marne (French: Quatrième circonscription de la Marne) is one of five electoral districts in the department of the same name, each of which returns one deputy to the French National Assembly in elections using the two-round system, with a run-off if no candidate receives more than 50% of the vote in the first round.

Description
The constituency – which covers the north-eastern part of the department and includes the prefecture of Châlons-en-Champagne – is made up of eight (pre-2015) cantons: those of Châlons-sur-Marne I, Châlons-sur-Marne II, Châlons-sur-Marne III, Châlons-sur-Marne IV, Givry-en-Argonne, Marson, Sainte-Menehould, and Ville-sur-Tourbe.

Like the others in the department, the 4th constituency has leant consistently towards the right politically, once again returning a conservative – Lise Magnier of Les Républicains – in the 2017 election. However, shortly after the election Magnier joined Agir, a moderate-right party supporting Emmanuel Macron's centrist parliamentary majority.

Historic representation

Election results

2022 

 
 
|-
| colspan="8" bgcolor="#E9E9E9"|
|-
 

 
 
 
 

* Magnier stood for LR at the previous election and swings are calculated based on parties and alliances.

2017

2012

 
 
 
 
 
 
|-
| colspan="8" bgcolor="#E9E9E9"|
|-

Sources
Official results of French elections from 2002: "Résultats électoraux officiels en France" (in French).

Official results of French elections from 2017: "" (in French).

4